Laurenene is a diterpene natural product with an unusual [5.5.5.7]fenestrane structure.  It was first discovered in extracts from the New Zealand tree species Dacrydium cupressinum by researchers at the University of Otago.  It has since been found in other species of New Zealand trees, such as Podocarpus totara.

References

Diterpenes